This is a list of states in the Holy Roman Empire beginning with the letter C:

References

C